María Eugenia de Beer (died 1652), was a Spanish chalcographer.

In  1641 she married Nicolas Merstraten. She was known for her production of engraved illustrations. Many of her motifs were religious or mythological. She signed her works with the name "Doña".

 Carrete Parrondo, Juan, «Divertimento y trascendencia: estampas de María Eugenia de Beer, 1640 – 1652», en Cuaderno de aves para el príncipe, Barcelona, Gustavo Gili, 1982.

References

17th-century births
1652 deaths
17th-century Spanish people
17th-century engravers
Spanish people of Dutch descent